Serghei Covaliov (14 October 1944 – 16 May 2011) was a Romanian sprint canoeist. He was the child of Mr. and Mrs. Simeon Covaliov. He mostly competed in doubles together with Ivan Patzaichin, a fellow Lipovan Russian born in the same village. They won a gold and a silver medal at the 1968 and 1972 Olympics, respectively, missing the first place in 1972 by 0.03 seconds. At the world championships they won one gold, one silver and one bronze medal in 1970–1971, while Covaliov also had a gold medal in 1966 with Vicol Calabiciov, another canoer from his village. Covaliov died aged 66 after a severe concussion he suffered while canoeing.

References

External links

1944 births
2011 deaths
People from Tulcea County
Canoeists at the 1968 Summer Olympics
Canoeists at the 1972 Summer Olympics
Olympic canoeists of Romania
Olympic gold medalists for Romania
Olympic silver medalists for Romania
Romanian male canoeists
Romanian people of Russian descent
Olympic medalists in canoeing
ICF Canoe Sprint World Championships medalists in Canadian

Medalists at the 1972 Summer Olympics
Medalists at the 1968 Summer Olympics